5ive is a 2016 Nigerian web series, starring Asa'ah Samuel, Ini Dima-Okojie, KC Ejelonu, Udoka Oyeka, and Baaj Adebule. The series debut was on November 3, 2016.

Plot 
It tells a story about the relationship that exist among five friends and the day to day challenges they face.

Cast
Asa'ah Samuel
Ini Dima-Okojie
Baaj Adebule
KC Ejelonu
Samuel Ajiobola
Ndubuisi Donald
Udoka Oyeka
Abimola Ademoye

Reception 
The production quality and determination of the crew was identified as positives. The presence of Dima-Okojie was also noted as a plus in the series.

References 

2010s Nigerian television series